Cham Zereshk-e Olya (also Romanized as Cham Zereshk-e ‘Olyā) is a village in Dasht-e Hor Rural District, in the Central District of Salas-e Babajani County, Kermanshah Province, Iran. At the 2006 census, its population was 815, in 148 families.

References 

Populated places in Salas-e Babajani County